Eresiomera isca, the common pearly, is a butterfly in the family Lycaenidae. It is found in Guinea, Sierra Leone, Liberia, Ivory Coast, Ghana, Nigeria, Cameroon, Bioko, Gabon, the Republic of the Congo, the Central African Republic and the Democratic Republic of the Congo. The habitat consists of forests and swamp forests.

Subspecies
Eresiomera isca isca (Nigeria: east of the Niger river, Cameroon, Equatorial Guinea: Bioko, Gabon, Congo, Central African Republic, Democratic Republic of the Congo: Kinshasa, Equateur, Tshuapa, Mongala and Uele)
Eresiomera isca occidentalis Collins & Larsen, 1998 (Guinea, Sierra Leone, Liberia, Ivory Coast, Ghana, Nigeria: west of the Niger river)

References

Butterflies described in 1873
Poritiinae
Butterflies of Africa
Taxa named by William Chapman Hewitson